"Moonshadow Road" is a song co-written and recorded by American country music artist T. Graham Brown.  It was released in September 1990 as the second single from the album Bumper to Bumper.  The song reached #18 on the Billboard Hot Country Singles & Tracks chart.  Brown wrote the song with Verlon Thompson and Gary Nicholson.

Chart performance

References

1990 singles
T. Graham Brown songs
Songs written by Gary Nicholson
Songs written by Verlon Thompson
Song recordings produced by Barry Beckett
Capitol Records Nashville singles
1990 songs
Songs written by T. Graham Brown